Whyte Chemicals Ltd is a former British chemical distribution and production company, headquartered in Finchley, in north London, and with a distribution centre in Denaby, South Yorkshire.

Whyte Chemicals was a privately owned company and a division of Whyte Group. It was established in 1976 and had a turnover in the region of £70 million.  it was one of the largest private distributors of chemicals and polymers in the United Kingdom, and was also a manufacturer of pharmaceuticals.

After encountering credit problems, Whyte Chemicals entered administration in the first half of 2018 and in June that year was acquired by German company OQEMA; it is now part of OQEMA Ltd, the company's UK division which was formed with the acquisition of Lansdowne Chemical plc.

References

External links
Official website, archived on 13 February 2018
OQEMA Ltd.

Chemical companies based in London
Companies based in the London Borough of Barnet
Chemical companies established in 1976
1976 establishments in England
Companies that have entered administration in the United Kingdom